Jaya Seal Ghosh,  the renowned actress and dancer, started learning Bharatanatyam from a very early age under Guru Indira P. P. Bora for five years. Simultaneously, she was also acting in Assamese television and did plays with noted Assamese theatre personalities from NSD like Dulal Roy and Baharul Islam who inspired her. To pursue this interest she went to the National School of Drama in New Delhi where she subsequently completed her three-year course in 1997.

The years that followed sow her base to Bombay and emerge as one of the leading actresses in the country. She went to act in 19 feature films in 8 languages besides appearing in several ad commercials. Some of Jaya's films received National and International Awards in Film Festivals like Venice, Pussan. Among her noteworthy films, she holds Uttara, by Buddhadeb Dasgupta close to her heart. She was nominated for best actress in the year 2000 for Uttara. She also seen in ‘Kahani Ghar Ghar Ki’ in 2004. Some of her well-known films are Chal & Xcuse Me (Hindi), Penninmanathaithottu(Tamil) opposite Prabhu Deva, Samurai(Tamil) opposite Vikram, Bahala Channa Gide (Kannada) opposite Shivraj Kumar, Magunido Sagodo (Odiya) which won the National Award for best Odiya film in 2003, Thilaadanam (Telugu) Which won National Award for best debut director to the late 6 time National and International award-winning Film Critic and Director K.N.T. Sastry and also won best foreign film and New Currents Award award in Pussan film festival in 2003, Shesh Thikana (Bengali) etc. She has worked in more than thirty ad commercials like Dettol, Colgate, Clinic plus oil n shampoo, Sun drop oil etc.

She received the Best Actress Award at the Assam Prag Cine Awards for the Assamese film Shrinkhol 2014.

Throughout this phase, she also continued her primary passion - dance. While in Mumbai she trained under Guru Vaibhav Arekar and Guru Rajeshri Shirke at Lasya academy. Later she trained under Guru Naresh Pillai also in Mumbai.

After shifting her base to Kolkata, Jaya joined Kalamandalam under the guidance of Guru Thankamani Kutty in the year 2005. Now she is continuing her learning under Bidushi Rama Vaidyanathan. Jaya has performed as a dancer at many prestigious venues. She regaled audiences at Detroit's Cobo Arena at the inauguration of the 2007 Bengali Sammelan & Muscat show in May 2015.

Jaya also worked with renowned theatre personality Usha Ganguly as the main lead in her production Chandalika. Recently she has acted in the film Arshinagar directed by Aparna Sen. Film Alifa in Bengali language shot at Guwahati directed by Deep Choudhury which has been selected in 2016 22nd Kolkata International Film Festival received best debut director award in 2017 national award and Best film in OTTAWA film FEST. She won the best actress award for the film Alifa in Lonawala Film Festival (LIFT). In 2018 received best actress award in Hyderabad Bengali film festival for the film Alifa.

Filmography

|2022 || ASHRAM 3 -||}

Television
 Kahani Ghar Ghar Ki as Swati
 Rishtey – Episode 79

References

External links

Actresses from Guwahati
Actresses in Assamese cinema
Actresses in Bengali cinema
Actresses in Hindi cinema
Actresses in Hindi television
Actresses in Kannada cinema
Actresses in Tamil cinema
Actresses in Telugu cinema
Indian film actresses
Living people
National School of Drama alumni
21st-century Indian actresses
Actresses in Odia cinema
Year of birth missing (living people)